Arab Venezuelans refers to Venezuelan citizens of Arab origin or descent. There are around 1,600,000 Venezuelans of Arab origin, mainly from Lebanon, Syria and Palestine. Most Arab Venezuelans are of Syrian descent with their number between 400,000 and 1 million inhabitants, and Lebanese descent with their number between 341,000 and 500,000.

Migration history
Arab immigration to Venezuela started as early as the 19th and 20th centuries. They came mostly from the Ottoman provinces of Lebanon, Syria, and Palestine, and are present in significant numbers in Caracas. 
 
Immigration of Arabs in Venezuela has influenced Venezuelan culture, in particular Arabic food and music.

In religion, the majority of Arab-Venezuelans are Christians who belong to the Roman Catholic, Eastern Orthodox and Eastern Rite Catholic Churches. There are few Muslims.

According to the Venezuelan Institute of Statistics, about one million Venezuelans have Syrian origins and more than 20,000 Venezuelans are registered in the Venezuelan Embassy in Damascus. Other sources stated that there is around 60,000 Syrian-Venezuelans living in Syria. More than 200,000 people from the Sweida area carry Venezuelan citizenship and most are members of Syria's Druze sect, who immigrated to Venezuela in the past century.  In 2021 The largest Druze communities outside the Middle East are in Venezuela (60,000) and in the United States (50,000).

Notable people
Tarek El Aissami, Venezuelan Vice President, former Minister for the Interior and Justice 
Tarek Saab, politician, lawyer, and poet
Mariam Habach, Beauty Queen, Miss Venezuela 2015
 Abdel el Zabayar, politician

See also

Syrian Catholic Apostolic Exarchate of Venezuela
Islam in Venezuela
Lebanese Venezuelans
Syrian Venezuelans
Arab diaspora
Arab diaspora in Colombia

References

External links
 Al Jadid: Arabs making their mark in Latin America

 
Ethnic groups in Venezuela
Demographics of Venezuela
Arab groups
Arab diaspora in South America